Neshanic is an unincorporated community within Hillsborough Township, in Somerset County, New Jersey, United States.  It is located near the South Branch Raritan River. The Neshanic Historic District was listed on the National Register of Historic Places in 1979.

Demographics

History
The name comes from a tribe of the Raritan tribe of Lenape Native Americans who lived along the river. Community life for the Dutch farmers who settled there began around 1750 and centered on a church, a school, a grist mill and a tavern owned by John Bennett, which historians say was most instrumental in forming the village. The first mill was built by Bergen Huff around 1770 and there was also a tannery which supplied leather to the people of the village as well as to the nearby town of New Brunswick. At one time the area surrounding the Shirk farm and extending along the Sourland Mountains was the largest peach producing region in the State.

Historic district

The Neshanic Historic District is a historic district encompassing the village. It was added to the National Register of Historic Places on August 1, 1979 for its significance in settlement and religion. It includes 23 contributing buildings.

Points of interest
Nearby Neshanic Mills was added to the NRHP in 1978. The original Mill was built in 1810 and the later rebuilt by Andrew Lane in 1876. It is also known as the Amerman Mill. It operated until the late 1940s and is now a private residence.

See also
Neshanic Station, New Jersey

References

External links
 
 Branchburg Rescue Squad

Hillsborough Township, New Jersey
Historic districts on the National Register of Historic Places in New Jersey
National Register of Historic Places in Somerset County, New Jersey
New Jersey Register of Historic Places
Unincorporated communities in Somerset County, New Jersey
Unincorporated communities in New Jersey